Stanley G. Stroup (September 18, 1904 – March 1, 1977) was a member of the Pennsylvania State Senate, serving from 1961 to 1974.

References

Republican Party Pennsylvania state senators
Presidents pro tempore of the Pennsylvania Senate
1904 births
1971 deaths
20th-century American politicians